Dalbo is an unincorporated community in Dalbo Township, Isanti County, Minnesota, United States.

Isanti County Roads 3, 13 and 57; and State Highway 47 (MN 47) are three of the main routes in the community.  Nearby places include Cambridge, Pine Brook, Wyanett, Lewis Lake, Ogilvie, and Dalbo Wildlife Management Area.  Stanchfield Creek flows through the community.

Dalbo is thought to be named in honor of immigrants from Dalarna, Sweden, it is more likely that Dalbo is named for the place of the same name in Dalsland, Sweden.  Dalbo has definite immigrant ties to both Venjan and Älvdalen, in Dalarna.

Infrastructure

Transportation
  Minnesota State Highway 47
  Isanti County Road 3
  Isanti County Road 13
  Isanti County Road 57

References

 Rand McNally Road Atlas – 2007 edition – Minnesota entry
 Official State of Minnesota Highway Map – 2013/2014 edition

Unincorporated communities in Minnesota
Unincorporated communities in Isanti County, Minnesota